"How Does a Moment Last Forever" is a song written by lyricist Tim Rice and composer Alan Menken for the Disney live action film Beauty and the Beast (2017), a remake of the animated musical of the same name. This Broadway-inspired ballad is performed in the movie by American actor Kevin Kline in his role as Maurice. It describes the relationship between his character and that of his wife, Belle's deceased mother. Later in the film, Belle (Emma Watson) performs the song as she discovers the truth about her mother's fate. "How Does a Moment Last Forever" was also recorded by Canadian pop singer Celine Dion, whose version was also included on the film's soundtrack, released on March 10, 2017. Her version plays over the ending credits of the film.

In the original animated film, Maurice does not sing at all. The remake, however, explores both Belle's and the Beast's past. Belle's backstory serves to build a foundation for her relationship with the Beast. For director Bill Condon, adding detail to both Belle's and the Beast's past was necessary for the audiences to understand the characters: "They're both outsiders, but how did Belle wind up being so different from everybody else in a town where nobody understands her, and how did the Beast become the person who earned that curse? That's the stuff we started to fill in", he said.

"How Does a Moment Last Forever" is a ballad and its lyrics deals with the theme of nostalgia. According to Menken, it’s about hanging on to precious moments. In Beauty and the Beast, it is performed twice, first by Maurice when he reminisces about his deceased wife and later by Belle after she discovers her mother's fate. Dion was contacted to record a pop version of the song. Although she initially had doubts, she ultimately agreed because of the impact that recording "Beauty and the Beast" has had on her career. Although she was unable to promote her version, which prompted Disney to release "Evermore" as a single instead, the song has made an impact in certain countries due to the film's success at the box office. It was met with generally positive reviews from critics. However, some felt that the song is unmemorable and compared it negatively to other songs recorded by Dion for movie soundtracks.

Production

Director Bill Condon originally intended to include songs from the Broadway musical adaptation of Beauty and the Beast in the remake. However, Disney decided to recruit composer Alan Menken and lyricist Tim Rice to write entirely new songs for the film instead. Original Beauty and the Beast composer Menken reunited with Rice, with whom he had previously collaborated on the 1994 musical to write three new songs for the remake, including "How Does a Moment Last Forever", whose original title was "Our Song Lives On". Rice once again replaced Howard Ashman, the animated film's lyricist, who had died from HIV-related complications in 1991. The live action film marks the first collaboration between Menken and Rice in over two decades; the last time they worked together had been in the Beauty and the Beast musical. Menken believes that the songs he and Rice had written for the musical would not have translated well to the screen due to the structural differences between the two formats.

Context and use in Beauty and the Beast
One of at least nine significant changes made to the film specifically for the remake, "How Does a Moment Last Forever" was conceived to explain Belle's backstory. Her quest to find out her mother's fate serves, in the plot, as a foundation for her relationship with the Beast, who also lost his mother as a child. In Beauty and the Beast, the song is first performed by Maurice (Kline) shortly after the opening act "Belle". Belle (Watson) arrives at their house in the village and peeps on her father crafting a music box. He sings "How Does a Moment Last Forever" and reminisces about his deceased wife and their life together in Paris. After he realizes his daughter is watching him, he quickly finishes the music box, which is modelled after him and his wife and avoids to answer any of Belle's questions about her mother. "It's obvious that he's still holding on to her", wrote Bustle'''s Olivia Truffaut-Wong. This version was dubbed "Music Box" in the soundtrack listing.

Later in the film, the Beast (Dan Stevens) allows Belle to use his enchanted book so they can travel wherever she wants. She uses it to return to the Parisian home where she lived as a baby with her parents. There, while she sings "How Does a Moment Last Forever", they find a Plague mask and Belle learns that her mother fell victim of the plague. A flashback explains that Belle's mother had pleaded with Maurice to abandon her in order to protect their baby daughter from the plague, which Maurice tearfully does. The scene adds more depth to Belle and solidifies her bond with the Beast. According to Truffaut-Wong, "she experiences this extremely intimate moment with him and turns to him for safety and comfort after, asking him to take her back home". This version was dubbed "Montmartre" in the soundtrack listing, after the Parisian neighbourhood of the same name. In addition to these two performances, portions of the song are also interpolated into the underscore of the film.

Reception
The song received generally positive reviews from critics upon its release. Broadway World described it as "an emotional ballad about holding onto life's precious moments". SunStar felt the song sadly laments Maurice's feeling towards his deceased wife. Hello magazine described it as both "reflective and upbeat", and worthy of an Academy Award for Best Original Song nomination. Us Weekly praised Dion's "powerhouse vocals" that perform the song's "spirited riffs and flawless octave changes". Hollywood Life thought the "stunning" song would leave audiences in tears, while NDTV Movies thought the song was a "subtle nod to the baggage that this production brings with it".Rolling Stone gave the song a mixed review, saying that although "How Does a Moment Last Forever" never reaches the "cinematic peaks" of "My Heart Will Go On", it sees Dion poignantly perform with bombast while having an understated conclusion. In a more negative light, Metro compared the song unfavourably to "Beauty and the Beast", while Mashable felt the "wistful" tune "fails to make much of an impression" even after its three versions.

Celine Dion version
Celine Dion had previously recorded the pop version of "Beauty and the Beast" with R&B artist Peabo Bryson; this song helped to establish her career as a music star in the Anglosphere. Menken asked her to be a part of the live action project as well by recording her own rendition of "How Does a Moment Last Forever", which would play over the end credits. Her version features a "swelling mix of piano, accordion and orchestral strings" and was recorded to an already existing music track that Menken had cut when the rest of the score was recorded.

Dion initially had doubts about whether or not to record the song due to the recent death of her husband and manager René Angélil, who had previously helped her secure the 1991 pop duet. While ultimately accepting the opportunity, she said: "[The] first Beauty and the Beast decision was made with my husband. Now I'm making decisions on my own. It's a little bit harder. I couldn't say yes right away, because I felt like I was kind of cheating in a way". She eventually felt compelled to record the song because of the impact Beauty and the Beast has had on her career. According to her, "I was at the beginning of my career, it put me on the map, it put me where I am today".

In May 2017, Dion added "How Does a Moment Last Forever" to the set list of her Las Vegas show, Celine. She also performed it during her 2017 European tour.

Music video
The music video for Dion's version was released on April 24, 2017, and it only had movie footage while the song played.

Chart performance
Disney released Dion's version on its official YouTube channel on March 8, 2017, nine days before the release of the film. Although not officially released as a single from Beauty and the Beast's soundtrack, due to Dion's unavailability to promote it, "How Does a Moment Last Forever" has made an impact in certain countries due to the film's success at the box office. It has peaked at number one for two weeks in the singer's native Canadian province of Quebec, number nine on the US Billboard''s Kid Digital Song Sales, number 94 on the UK Singles Downloads Chart (number 80 in Scotland) and number 124 on the French Digital Singles Chart (number 125 on the Overall Sales Chart). "How Does a Moment Last Forever" also proved to be successful in South Korea, where it reached number six.

Accolades
On November 17, 2017, "How Does a Moment Last Forever" won a Hollywood Music in Media Award in category Original Song — Sci-Fi, Fantasy, Horror Film. It was also nominated in the Original Song — Animated Film category.

Charts

References

2017 singles
2017 songs
2010s ballads
Celine Dion songs
Pop ballads
Songs about nostalgia
Songs with lyrics by Tim Rice
Songs with music by Alan Menken
Songs from Beauty and the Beast (franchise)
Walt Disney Records singles
Song recordings produced by Alan Menken